The Presumption of Stanley Hay, MP is a 1925 British silent drama film directed by Sinclair Hill and starring David Hawthorne, Betty Faire, Fred Raynham and Kinsey Peile. It is adapted from a novel by Nowell Kaye.

Cast
 David Hawthorne as Stanley Hay
 Betty Faire as Princess Berenice 
 Fred Raynham as Baron Hertzog 
 Kinsey Peile as The King 
 Nelson Ramsey as The Spy 
 Dora De Winton as Lady Barmouth 
 Madame d'Esterre as Madame de Vere 
 Eric Bransby Williams as Honorable Member

References

Bibliography
 Low, Rachael. History of the British Film, 1918-1929. George Allen & Unwin, 1971.

External links

1925 films
Films directed by Sinclair Hill
1925 drama films
British drama films
British silent feature films
Films based on British novels
Stoll Pictures films
Films shot at Cricklewood Studios
British black-and-white films
1920s English-language films
1920s British films
Silent drama films